Panda, Gorilla & Co. is a German television series.

See also
List of German television series

External links
 

2006 German television series debuts
2010s German television series
Television series about pandas
Television shows set in Berlin
Berlin Zoological Garden
German-language television shows
Das Erste original programming